The Fleet Air Arm (FAA) is one of the five fighting arms of the Royal Navy and is responsible for the delivery of naval air power both from land and at sea. The Fleet Air Arm operates the F-35 Lightning II for maritime strike and the AW159 Wildcat and AW101 Merlin for commando and anti-submarine warfare.

The Fleet Air Arm today is a predominantly rotary force, with helicopters undertaking roles once performed by biplanes such as the Fairey Swordfish.

The Fleet Air Arm was formed in 1924 as an organisational unit of the Royal Air Force, which was then operating the aircraft embarked on RN ships—the Royal Naval Air Service having been merged with the Army's Royal Flying Corps in 1918 to form the Royal Air Force—and did not come under the direct control of the Admiralty until mid-1939. During the Second World War, the Fleet Air Arm operated aircraft on ships as well as land-based aircraft that defended the Royal Navy's shore establishments and facilities.

History

Beginnings

British naval flying started in 1909, with the construction of an airship for naval duties. In 1911 the Royal Navy graduated its first aeroplane pilots at the Royal Aero Club flying ground at RAF Eastchurch, Isle of Sheppey under the tutelage of pioneer aviator George Bertram Cockburn. In May 1912, naval and army aviation were combined to become the Royal Flying Corps (RFC). The Naval Wing of the RFC lasted until July 1914 when the Royal Navy reformed its air branch, under the Air Department of the Admiralty, naming it the Royal Naval Air Service (RNAS). By the outbreak of the First World War, in August 1914, the RNAS had more aircraft under its control than the remaining RFC. The roles of the RNAS were fleet reconnaissance, patrolling coasts for enemy ships and submarines, attacking enemy coastal territory and defending Britain from enemy air raids, along with deployment along the Western Front. In April 1918 the RNAS, which at this time had 67,000 officers and men, 2,949 aircraft, 103 airships and 126 coastal stations, merged with the RFC to form the Royal Air Force.

Fleet Air Arm
On 1 April 1924, the Fleet Air Arm of the Royal Air Force was formed, encompassing those RAF units that normally embarked on aircraft carriers and fighting ships. The year was significant for British naval aviation as only weeks before the founding of the Fleet Air Arm, the Royal Navy had commissioned , the world's first ship to be designed and built as an aircraft carrier. Over the following months RAF Fleet Air Arm Fairey IIID reconnaissance biplanes operated off Hermes, conducting flying trials.

On 24 May 1939 the Fleet Air Arm was returned to Admiralty control under the "Inskip Award" (named after the Minister for Co-ordination of Defence overseeing the British re-armament programme) and renamed the Air Branch of the Royal Navy. At the onset of the Second World War, the Fleet Air Arm consisted of 20 squadrons with only 232 frontline aircraft, and 191 additional trainers. By the end of the war the strength of the Fleet Air Arm was 59 aircraft carriers, 3,700 aircraft, 72,000 officers and men and 56 Naval air stations.

During the war, the FAA operated fighters, torpedo bombers and reconnaissance aircraft. Following the Dunkirk evacuation and the commencement of the Battle of Britain, the Royal Air Force soon found itself critically short of fighter pilots. In the summer of 1940, the RAF had just over 800 fighter pilots and as personnel shortages worsened; the RAF turned to the Admiralty to ask for help from the Fleet Air Arm. Fleet Air Arm crews under RAF Fighter Command were either seconded individually to RAF fighter squadrons or entire as with 804 and 808 Naval Air Squadrons. The former provided dockyard defence during the Battle of Britain with Sea Gladiators.

In British home waters and out into the Atlantic Ocean, operations against Axis shipping and submarines in support of the RN were mounted by RAF Coastal Command with large patrol bombers, flying boats and land-based fighter-bombers. The aircraft carrier had replaced the battleship as the capital ship of the RN and its aircraft were now its principal offensive weapons. The top scoring fighter ace with 17 victories was Commander Stanley Orr, the Royal Marine ace was Ronald Cuthbert Hay with 13 victories. A number of Royal Marines were FAA pilots during the war.

Notable Fleet Air Arm operations during the war included the Battle of Taranto, the sinking of the Bismarck, the attempt to prevent the Channel Dash, Operation Tungsten against the Tirpitz and Operation Meridian against oil plants in Sumatra.

Post-war history

After the war the FAA needed to fly jet aircraft from their carriers. The jet aircraft of the era were considerably less effective at low speeds than propeller aircraft, but propeller aircraft could not effectively fight jets at the high speeds flown by jet aircraft. The FAA took on its first jet, the Sea Vampire, in the late 1940s. The Sea Vampire was the first jet credited with taking off and landing on a carrier. The Air Arm continued with high-powered prop aircraft alongside the new jets resulting in the FAA being woefully outpowered during the Korean War. Nevertheless, jets were not yet wholly superior to propeller aircraft and a flight of ground attack Hawker Sea Furies downed a MiG-15 and damaged others in an engagement.

As jets became larger, more powerful and faster they required more space to take off and land. The US Navy simply built much larger carriers. The Royal Navy had a few large carriers built and completed after the end of the war but another solution was sought. This was partly overcome by the introduction of a Royal Navy idea to angle the flight deck away from the centre line so that the aircraft landing had a clear run away from the usual forward deck park. An associated British invention, intended to provide more precise optical guidance to aircraft on final approaching the deck, was the Fresnel lens optical landing aid. Another Royal Navy invention was the use of a steam-powered catapult to cater for the larger and heavier aircraft (both systems were adopted by the US Navy).

Defence cuts across the British armed forces during the 1960s and 1970s led to the withdrawal of existing Royal Navy aircraft carriers, transfer of Fleet Air Arm fixed-wing jet strike aircraft such as the F-4K (FG.1) Phantom II and Buccaneer S.2 to the Royal Air Force, and cancellation of large replacement aircraft carriers, including the CVA-01 design. When HMS Hermes was converted in 1980/81 to a STOVL carrier to operate Sea Harriers, a 'Ski-jump ramp' was fitted to aid take-off. A new series of small carriers, the  anti-submarine warfare ships (known as "through deck cruisers") were built and equipped with the Sea Harrier a derivative of the Hawker Siddeley Harrier VTOL aircraft. These carriers incorporated an upswept forward section of the flight deck that deflected the aircraft upward on launch and permitted heavier loads to be carried by the Harrier, for example in weaponry, and the system was used extensively in the Falklands War, with both Hermes and Invincible part of the Task Force.
At the end of the Cold War in 1989 the Fleet Air Arm was under the command of the Flag Officer Naval Air Command, a rear admiral based at RNAS Yeovilton.
 Flag Officer Naval Air Command (FONAC), at RNAS Yeovilton
 RNAS Prestwick:
 819 Naval Air Squadron, (Anti-submarine, 12× Sea King HAS.5)
 826 Naval Air Squadron, (Anti-submarine, 12× Sea King HAS.6)
 HMS Gannet SAR Flight, (Search & Rescue, 8× Sea King HU.5)
 RNAS Yeovilton:
 707 Naval Air Squadron, (Air Assault, 10× Sea King HC.4)
 800 Naval Air Squadron, (12× Sea Harrier FA.2)
 801 Naval Air Squadron, (12× Sea Harrier FA.2)
 845 Naval Air Squadron, (Air Assault, 10× Sea King HC.4)
 846 Naval Air Squadron, (Air Assault, 10× Sea King HC.4)
 899 Naval Air Squadron, (Training, 24× Sea Harrier FA.2)
 Fleet Requirements and Aircraft Direction Unit, (Aggressor Squadron, Canberra TT.18, Hawker Hunter GA.11)
 RNAS Culdrose:
 705 Naval Air Squadron, (Basic Helicopter Training, 38× Gazelle HT.2)
 706 Naval Air Squadron, (Sea King Training, 12× various types of Sea King)
 750 Naval Air Squadron, (Observer Training, Jetstream T2)
 771 Naval Air Squadron, (Search & Rescue, 12× Sea King HU.5)
 814 Naval Air Squadron, (Anti-submarine, 12× Sea King HAS.5)
 820 Naval Air Squadron, (Anti-submarine, 12× Sea King HAS.6)
 824 Naval Air Squadron, (Anti-submarine, 12× Sea King HAS.6) (disbanded August 1989)
 849 Naval Air Squadron, (Airborne early warning and control, 10× Sea King AEW.2A, 4× Sea King AEW.5)
 RNAS Portland:
 702 Naval Air Squadron, (Aircrew & Maintenance Training, 24× Lynx HAS.3S)
 772 Naval Air Squadron, (Air Assault, 10× Sea King HC.4)
 810 Naval Air Squadron, (Anti-submarine, 12× Sea King HAS.6)
 815 Naval Air Squadron, (Frigate & Destroyer Helicopters, 32× Lynx HAS.3S, most deployed on frigates and destroyers at sea)
 829 Naval Air Squadron, (Frigate & Destroyer Helicopters, 32× Lynx HAS.3S, most deployed on frigates and destroyers at sea)

Fleet Air Arm Inventory 1989 
The inventory of the Fleet Air Arm in 1989 consisted of the following aircraft:
 Combat aircraft:
 42× Sea Harrier FRS.1/F(A).2
 2x/2× Sea Harrier T.4A/T.4N
 Helicopters:
 60+ Sea King HAS.5
 31+ Sea King HAS.6
 10× Sea King AEW.2A
 33× Sea King HC.4
 80+ Lynx HAS.3S
 23×/8× Gazelle HT.2/HT.3
 Trainers:
 3× Canberra TT.18
 14× Chipmunk T.10
 5× Hunter T.8M
 12×/9× Hunter GA.11/T8
 19× Jetstream T.2
 Liaison:
 16× Dassault Falcon 20 (Civil-registered)

Post Cold War

In 2000 the Sea Harrier force was merged with the RAF's Harrier GR7 fleet to form Joint Force Harrier. The Fleet Air Arm began withdrawing the Sea Harrier from service in 2004 with the disbandment of 800 NAS. 801 NAS disbanded on 28 March 2006 at RNAS Yeovilton (HMS Heron). 800 and 801 NAS were then combined to form the Naval Strike Wing, flying ex-RAF Harrier GR7 and GR9s. On 1 April 2010, NSW reverted to the identity of 800 Naval Air Squadron. The Harrier GR7 and GR9 retired from service in December 2010 following the Strategic Defence and Security Review 2010.

Two new  carriers able to operate the F-35B short take-off and landing variant of the US Lockheed Martin Lightning II aircraft were constructed. In the Strategic Defence and Security Review 2015, it was announced that the carriers would enter service "from 2018". The procurement plan is for a force of 138 F-35 aircraft, which are intended to be operated by both the RAF and FAA from a common pool, in the same manner as the Joint Force Harrier. With the introduction of the F-35, the Fleet Air Arm will return to the operation of fixed-wing strike aircraft at sea. In 2013, an initial cadre of Royal Air Force and Royal Navy pilots and aircraft maintenance personnel were assigned to the U.S. Marine Corps' Marine Fighter Attack Training Squadron 501 (VMFAT-501), part of the U.S. Air Force's 33rd Fighter Wing at Eglin Air Force Base, Florida, for training on the F-35B. 809 Naval Air Squadron will be the first FAA unit to operate the F-35B and will be based at RAF Marham.

Helicopters
Helicopters also became important combat platforms since the Second World War. Initially used in the search and rescue role, they were later developed for anti-submarine warfare and troop transport; during the 1956 Suez Crisis they were used to land Royal Marine Commando forces, the first time this had ever been done in combat. Originally operated only from carriers, the development of the Westland Wasp in the 1960s allowed helicopters to operate on all ships of frigate size or larger. Wasps, Sea Kings and Wessex helicopters all played an active part in the 1982 Falklands War, while Lynx helicopters played an attack role against Iraqi patrol boats in the 1991 Gulf War and Commando Sea King HC4s as well as the Lynx HMA Mk 8 from HMS Argyll, assisted in suppressing rebel forces in the British intervention in the Sierra Leone Civil War in 2000.

Museums
The Fleet Air Arm has a museum near RNAS Yeovilton (HMS Heron) in Somerset, England at which many of the great historical aircraft flown by the Service are on display, along with aircraft from other sources. There is also a Fleet Air Arm museum inside the Museum of Transport & Technology in Auckland, New Zealand. On display there is a full-size replica Fairey Swordfish, along with historic items and memorabilia.

The FAA today

Personnel
In 1938, Admiralty Fleet Orders 2885 announced the formation of an Air Branch of the Royal Naval Reserve. Thirty three unmarried men signed up for eighteen months full-time flying training; however, before these first volunteers were able to gain their wings Britain was at war. At the end of hostilities in 1945 the RNVR(A) was 46,000 strong, with over 8,000 aircrew. Post war the RNVR(A) comprised 12 dedicated reserve squadrons, grouped regionally into Air Divisions. However, defence cuts in 1957 disbanded the five Air Divisions, and the following year the RNVR was merged with the RNR.

Today
As of 1 December 2013, the Regular Fleet Air Arm has a reported strength of 5,000 personnel, which represents approximately 20% of the Royal Navy's total strength (excluding Royal Marines).

The Assistant Chief of the Naval Staff (Aviation & Carriers), the professional head (and also Rear Admiral Fleet Air Arm), is Rear Admiral Martin Connell as of February 2019. Under First Sea Lord Admiral Tony Radakin’s plans, the professional head of the Fleet Air Arm is set to shortly change to a one-star role, headed by a Commodore.

Members of the Fleet Air Arm continue to be known as WAFUs. WAFU ("wet and flipping useless") is said to actually derive from "Weapon and Fuel Users", a stores category for clothing.

Reserve Air Branch
The RNR Air Branch was commissioned at RNAS Yeovilton on 16 July 1980, and shortly afterwards 38 ex-regular aircrew began refresher training. Today the RNR Air Branch comprises approximately 250 ex-regular service Officers and Ratings, covering all aviation trades, tasked to support the Fleet Air Arm.

Insignia

The FAA is known for its use of the ‘Fleet Air Arm Zig Zag’: a light blue zig zag on a dark blue background.

The pattern is thought to have belonged to the "Perch Club", membership of which was restricted to those who had completed 100 deck landings without an accident. The zig zag was thought to have been taken from a Creeping Line Ahead, a parallel search pattern performed by FAA aircraft in a carrier task group.

Today, the dark blue background represents the Royal Navy; the colour of the zigzag represents the Royal Flying Corps, from which the Royal Naval Air Service was born; and the zigzag shape represents a nod to the Royal Artillery (red zigzag on blue background), given that the first people sent aloft in tethered balloons to spot the fall of shot were Royal Artillery observers. It was these observers who became early members of the Royal Flying Corps.

Aircrew wear flying badges, such as pilots wearing a pair of gold albatross wings. The wings badges also feature a crown and fouled anchor in the centre, to reflect the maritime element of the flying undertaken. Wings are worn on the left sleeve of naval aviators, unlike their other service counterparts.

Aircraft

The FAA operates fixed wing and rotary wing aircraft. It uses the same aircraft designation system as the RAF.

Fixed Wing

Training

Four types of fixed wing aircraft are operated by the FAA for training purposes: Pilot Grading is carried out using the Grob Tutor T1. Elementary Flying Training is then conducted on the Grob Prefect T1. From there, pilots are streamed to either Rotary or Fast-Jet.

Observer grading and training is done using four Beechcraft Avenger T1 before observers join their frontline aircraft.

Rotary
Today the largest section of the FAA is the rotary wing section. Pilots designated for rotary wing service train under No. 1 Flying Training School at RAF Shawbury. The school is a tri-Service organisation consisting of civilian and military instructors (including Naval instructors and a Naval Air Squadron) that take the student from basic flying through to more advanced flying such as instrument flying, navigation, formation and captaincy.

Its aviators fly one of four types of helicopters:

Commando Merlin

The HC4/4A AW101 Merlin (nicknamed "Junglie Merlin") serves as a medium lifter and troop transporter in support of the Royal Marines. The FAA received the Merlin HC3/HC3A fleet from the RAF, replacing the Commando Sea King in September 2014. These have been marinised and replaced with HC4s/HC4As, under the Merlin Life Sustainment Programme (MLSP) that was placed on contract in December 2013.

Commando Wildcat AH1

The AW159 Wildcat: the BRH (Battlefield Reconnaissance Helicopter) replaces the Westland Lynx as the Battlefield Reconnaissance Helicopter of the FAA. Along with the Commando Merlin, these squadrons operate under Commando Helicopter Force, which provides airborne support to 3 Commando Brigade of the Royal Marines.

Wildcat HMA2

The Wildcat HMA2 became the standard small ship borne helicopter in the FAA, with 28 Wildcats replacing the Lynx HMA8 in 2017. 28 AW159 Wildcat HMA2 helicopters perform a range of roles including anti-surface and anti-submarine warfare and airborne surveillance.

Merlin HM2

The Merlin HM2 ("Grey Merlin") is the FAA's primary anti-submarine warfare (ASW) helicopter, having replaced the Sea King HAS6 in the role. It is presently deployed with various ships of the Royal Navy. Merlin HM2 is set to operate Crowsnest replace the recently retired ASaC7 variant of the Sea King, which operated in the AEW role. The first Merlin HM2 test flight with Crowsnest was completed in April 2019. Initial operating capability of the system was significantly delayed. While Crowsnest was deployed with the U.K. carrier strike group in 2021, it experienced operating challenges and revised plans will now see Crowsnest achieve initial operating capability in the second quarter of 2023 and full operating capability in 2024/25. While all Merlins in the Royal Navy will be equipped to operate Crowsnest, only ten kits for the system are being acquired. It has been reported that initially five Merlins will be equipped with Crowsnest, three of these being normally assigned to the "high readiness" aircraft carrier.

Unmanned
The Royal Navy operates the AeroVironment Puma AE as of 2020.

Future aircraft

F-35B Lightning II

The introduction of the F-35B Lightning II will see a restoration of fixed wing, front-line operations to the FAA since the retirement of Joint Force Harrier in 2010.

An initial order of 48 airframes was made in 2012 to equip the air wings of the planned two Queen Elizabeth-class aircraft carriers, with the operation split between the FAA and the Royal Air Force, as was the case with Joint Force Harrier. 809 Naval Air Squadron was announced as the second UK unit to fly the F-35B (the first being 617 Squadron RAF) and will be the first FAA unit to operate the aircraft. It is understood that at least two further frontline squadrons will stand up in the future alongside 809, 617, 17(R) Test and Evaluation Squadron and an RAF-numbered Operational Conversion Unit, creating a total of six squadrons including the OCU and OEU. Under the Strategic Defence and Security Review of November 2015, the UK Government made a commitment to buying 138 F-35B, with at least 24 available for carrier use by 2023. Subsequently, following on the 2021 defence review, the First Sea Lord indicated that the new envisaged number was to be 60 aircraft initially and "then maybe more", up to a maximum of around 80 to hopefully equip four "deployable squadrons". In April 2022, the Deputy Chief of Defence Staff, Air Marshal Richard Knighton, told the House of Commons Defence Select Committee that the MoD was in discussions to purchase a second tranche of 26 F-35B fighters. Plans for frontline F-35B squadrons had been modified and now envisaged a total of three squadrons (rather than four) each deploying 12-16 aircraft. As of 2022, it is planned that at least one of these squadrons will be a Fleet Air Arm Squadron (No 809 Squadron). In surge conditions 24 F-35s might be deployed on the Queen Elizabeth-class carriers but a routine deployment would likely involve 12 aircraft.

In January 2019, initial operating capability for the UK's F-35B was announced with 18 F-35Bs jointly delivered to the UK. As of December 2022, 26 aircraft were operational in the UK and were based at RAF Marham. These aircraft regularly deployed for operations on the Queen Elizabeth-class aircraft carriers. Another 3 F-35s remained in the US for testing and evaluation purposes.

While 29 F-35B aircraft (including 3 based in the U.S.) had been delivered to the U.K. by the end of 2022, U.K. Defence Secretary Ben Wallace reported that the RAF and Royal Navy faced a considerable challenge in providing even the existing modest F-35B fleet with qualified pilots. As of late 2022 there were only 30 qualified British pilots (plus three exchange pilots from the United States and Australia) for the F-35. The average wait time for RAF trainee Typhoon and F-35 pilots, after completing the Military Flying Training System, was approximately 11 and 12 months respectively. A further gap of 68 weeks existed between completing Basic Flying Training and beginning Advanced Fast Jet Training. The resulting pilot shortage was a factor in being able to stand up the first Fleet Air Arm Squadron (809 Squadron) on a timely basis.

Squadrons and flights
A Fleet Air Arm flying squadron is formally titled Naval Air Squadron (NAS), a title used as a suffix to the squadron number. The FAA assigns numbers in the 700–799 range to training and operational conversion squadrons and numbers in the 800–899 range to operational squadrons. Exceptions to the 700–799 include operational conversion squadrons which also hold some form of operational commitment where they are then titled 800–899. During WWII the 1700 and 1800 ranges were also used for operational squadrons.

An additional flying unit of the Royal Navy is the FOST Helicopter Support Unit based at HMS Raleigh in Cornwall. This unit is not part of the Fleet Air Arm, but is directly under the control of Fleet operational Sea Training, operated by British International Helicopters (BIH). BIH also support various Royal Navy and NATO exercises with passenger and freight transfer services and transfers by hoist, for ships exercising both in the Atlantic and the North Sea.

The Royal Navy share both operational and training duties on the Lightning II with the RAF under a banner organisation called the Lightning Force, which will operate in the same manner as Joint Force Harrier.

Until March 2019, the Fleet Air Arm had responsibility for the Royal Navy Historic Flight, a heritage unit of airworthy aircraft representing the history of aviation in the Royal Navy. The Historic Flight was disbanded on 31 March 2019, with responsibility for maintaining and operating the aircraft transferred to Navy Wings, a charitable body that also runs the Fly Navy Heritage Trust.

Notable members

 Vice-Admiral Richard Bell Davies (1886–1966): the first naval aviator to receive the VC and the first naval aviator of the Fleet Air Arm to reach flag rank
 Vice-Admiral Sir Lumley Lyster (1888–1957): drew up attack plan in 1935 that was used for the Battle of Taranto five years later
 Admiral Sir Reginald Portal (1894–1983): naval aviator who was the younger brother of Marshal of the Royal Air Force Lord Portal (1893–1971)
 Captain Henry Fancourt (1900–2004): a pioneering aviator, he had a distinguished career in naval aviation until 1949. Worked for Short Bros and Hartland.
 Ralph Richardson (1902–1983): English stage and screen actor, volunteered as a navy pilot during Second World War and rose to the rank of lieutenant-commander in the Air Branch.
 Admiral of the Fleet Sir Caspar John (1903–1984): First Sea Lord 1960–63 and the first British naval aviator to reach the highest rank within the RN.
 Admiral Sir Walter Couchman (1905–1981): naval observer who earned his pilot's wings too, he led the fly-past for the Coronation Fleet Review in June 1953.
 Laurence Olivier (1907–1989): English stage and screen actor and director, volunteered as a navy pilot during the Second World War and rose to the rank of lieutenant in the Air Branch.
 Duncan Hamilton: English Grand Prix driver and winner of the 1953 24 Hours of Le Mans.
 Lieutenant Commander (A) Eugene Esmonde (1909–1942): posthumously awarded the Victoria Cross for leading 825 Naval Air Squadron Swordfish torpedo bombers in an attack on German capital ships during the "Channel Dash".
 Lieutenant Commander Roy Sydney Baker-Falkner (1916-1944): awarded the Distinguished Service Order for leading Operation Tungsten attack on the German battleship Tirpitz.
 Michael Hordern (1911–1995): actor, served as fighter controller during World War II.
 Jeffrey Quill (1913–1996): RAF officer and Spitfire test pilot (Vickers-Armstrongs) who served five months with Fleet Air Arm as T/Lt.Cdr RNVR in 1944–1945, helping to develop better carrier deck-landings with the Supermarine Seafire, the naval version of the Spitfire.
 Kenneth More (1914–1982): actor, including films such as Reach for the Sky and Sink the Bismarck.
 Commander Charles Lamb (1914–1981): author of the Second World War Fleet Air Arm autobiography War in a Stringbag.
 Vice-Admiral Sir Peter Compston (1915–2000): served briefly in the British Army, then in the RAF for two years, before transferring as a pilot to the Royal Navy in 1938.
 Admiral Sir (Leslie) Derek Empson (1918–1997): naval pilot who joined the Royal Navy as a naval rating. In his flying career, executed 782 aircraft carrier landings without a mishap.
 Rear-Admiral Cedric Kenelm Roberts (1918–2011): (always known as 'Chico') a distinguished naval pilot who joined the Royal Navy as a naval rating in 1940. He was personal pilot to Vice-Admiral Lumley Lyster in 1943, commanded three Naval Air Squadrons and was shot down during the Korean War. Later, he commanded three Naval Air Stations and ended his naval flying career as Flag Officer Naval Flying Training 1968–71.
 Lieutenant-Commander Charles Wines ("Charlie Wines") (1917–1991): joined the Royal Navy as a Supply Assistant, flew Swordfish torpedo bomber as a rating pilot in the Second World War. Commissioned as a pilot in 1944 he later spent more than twenty years, in the same job as a serving and retired officer, as the FAA Drafting Officer and as such the career manager for thousands of FAA ratings.
 Rear-Admiral Dennis Cambell (1907–2000): inventor of the angled flight deck for aircraft carriers in 1951.
 Rear-Admiral Nick Goodhart (1919–2011): inventor of the mirror-sight deck landing system for aircraft carriers in 1951.
 Captain Eric "Winkle" Brown (1919–2016): holds the world record for the most types of aircraft flown by an individual (487 types). As a test pilot he made the first-ever jet landing on an aircraft carrier in December 1945.
 Admiral Sir John Treacher (1924–2018): naval pilot who was promoted rear-admiral at the age of 45 and held four important flag appointments before leaving the Royal Navy in 1977, despite many expecting him to become First Sea Lord, for a career in business. Was at the helm of Westland during the political drama of the 1980s.
 Admiral Sir Ray Lygo (1924–2012): naval pilot who joined the Royal Navy as a naval rating in 1942 and who reached First Sea Lord in 1978, led a successful career in industry and was chief executive and deputy chairman of British Aerospace in the 1980s.
 Sir George Martin (1926–2016): record producer for The Beatles.
 Admiral of the Fleet Sir Ben Bathurst (1936–): First Sea Lord 1993–95 and the last Royal Navy officer to be promoted to five-star rank.
 Rear-Admiral Sir Robert Woodard KCVO (c.1939–): naval aviator commanded two Naval Air Squadrons, two warships, a Naval Air Station, the Clyde submarine base and ended his career as the Flag Officer Royal Yachts 1990–95, the only aviator to command the Royal Yacht .
 Commander Nigel David "Sharkey" Ward (1943–): commanded 801 Naval Air Squadron during the 1982 Falklands War.
 Rear-Admiral Iain Henderson (c. 1948–): the first officer, and first naval officer, to hold the modern appointment of Air Officer Commanding 3 Group 2000–01.
 Vice-Admiral Sir Adrian Johns (c. 1952–) is the first naval aviator to hold the post of Governor of Gibraltar.
 Commander Prince Andrew, Duke of York (1960–): served during the Falklands War 1982 and for some years afterwards.
 Captain Brian Young (1930–2009): former Sea Hawk pilot, later commanded the task group for Operation Paraquet during the Falklands War.

Some 64 naval pilots and nine observers have reached flag rank in the Royal Navy and four Royal Marines pilots general rank in the Royal Marines. Four of these admirals with pilot's 'wings' were air engineering officers (test pilots) and two were supply officers; two of the non-executive officers reached four-star rank: a supply officer, Admiral Sir Brian Brown (1934–), and a Royal Marine, General Sir Peter Whiteley (1920–2016).
 At least 21 naval Air Engineer Officers (AEOs) have reached flag rank (including the four test pilots (see above)).

See also
 Fleet Requirements and Aircraft Direction Unit
 List of air stations of the Royal Navy
 List of Fleet Air Arm aircraft squadrons
 List of all naval aircraft current and former of the United Kingdom
 List of aircraft of the Fleet Air Arm
 List of active United Kingdom military aircraft
 Fleet Air Arm Memorial

References

Sources

External links 

 
 Fleet Air Arm Rating Aircrewmans Association
 Fleet Air Arm Association
 Fleet Air Arm Officers' Association

 
1937 establishments in the United Kingdom
Fighting Arms of the Royal Navy
Gosport
Military in Hampshire
Military units and formations established in 1937
Naval aviation units and formations of the United Kingdom
Organisations based in Hampshire
Organisations based in Somerset
South Somerset